Source Code for Biology and Medicine was a peer-reviewed open-access scientific journal in the field of bioinformatics, including information systems and data mining. The journal was published by BioMed Central and was established in 2006. The editors-in-chief were Emmanuel Ifeachor (University of Plymouth) and Leif E. Peterson (The Methodist Hospital Research Institute).

Abstracting and indexing 
The journal is abstracted and indexed in Chemical Abstracts Service, EmBiology, and Scopus.

References

External links 
 

Publications established in 2006
English-language journals
BioMed Central academic journals
Monthly journals
Biomedical informatics journals